William Hay Wilson was an eminent Anglican priest in the first quarter of the 20th century.

Life 
He was educated at the University of Edinburgh and ordained in 1885. He was Chaplain at Inverness Cathedral then Rector of St James’ Church, Dingwall. He was Dean of Moray, Ross and Caithness from 1912  until his death on 7 October 1925. His wife died three years later.

References

1864 births
1935 deaths
People from Lambeth
English Anglicans
Deans of Moray, Ross and Caithness